The women's national 3x3 team of the Philippines represents the country in international 3x3 basketball matches and is controlled by the Samahang Basketbol ng Pilipinas.

History

In multi-sport Asian tournaments (2009–2016)
One of the Philippines' initial participation in women's 3x3 was at the 2009 Asian Youth Games in Singapore where it managed to advance from the preliminary round only to lose to South Korea in the quarterfinal.

The Philippine women's 3x3 also participated at the Asian Beach Games, particularly in the 2012, 2014, and 2016 editions.

2018 FIBA 3x3 World Cup
As the consequence of the Philippines hosting the 2018 edition of the FIBA 3x3 World Cup, the women's team was automatically qualified to play in the international tournament. The Philippines made their debut at the women's 3x3 debut after their men's team made their debut in the 2016 edition. It was the first time that a women's team will participate in a 3x3 tournament organized by FIBA. The national team was coached by Patrick Aquino and intended their stint to promote women's basketball in general in the country.

The lost their first match against the Netherlands, 11–21 and Germany, 10–12. Coach Aquino attributes the defeats to inexperience of the players in 3x3 basketball though he thought that team could potentially compete with European countries. They lost their remaining games to Spain, 17–21, and Hungary, 15–18 and finished at the bottom of Pool D. Their coach hoped that the Samahang Basketbol ng Pilipinas could lobby for the women's 3x3 participation in the 2018 Asian Games after their FIBA 3x3 World Cup stint. However the Philippines did not enter any team in 3x3 basketball in the continental games.

The Samahang Basketbol ng Pilipinas (SBP), the country's national association, plans to come up with a road map to help the Philippines qualify a team in 3x3 basketball in the 2020 Summer Olympics following the national team's stint in the 2018 FIBA 3x3 World Cup. The SBP plans to create a pool of players which will be dedicated to the 3x3 variant of basketball.

2019 FIBA Asia 3x3 Cup
The women's national team entered the 2019 FIBA Asia 3X3 Cup but had to participate in the qualifying draw in order to progress to the tournament proper. They managed to do so after topping their group in the qualifying draw which consisted of Samoa, Vanuatu and Chinese Taipei. In the group stage of the qualifying proper they suffered a defeat to Japan but won over Sri Lanka to progress to the quarterfinals. They ended their bid when they lost their quarterfinal tie against Australia.

2019 FIBA U18 World Cup
The Philippines' qualified to send a women's team in the 2019 FIBA U18 World Cup in Ulanbataar, Mongolia and is set to make a debut in the international youth tournament.

Senior competitions

World Cup

Asia Cup

Youth competitions

U18 World Championships

Asia U18 Cup

Squad

Previous

Senior

Youth

References

Philippines women's national basketball team
Women's national 3x3 basketball teams
3x3 basketball in the Philippines